Backyard Brawl is an American college football rivalry between the University of Pittsburgh Panthers and West Virginia University Mountaineers.

Backyard Brawl may also refer to:

 Millsaps–Mississippi College rivalry, known as the Backyard Brawl, a sports rivalry between the Millsaps College Majors and the Mississippi College Choctaws
 "Backyard Brawl", song on 2003 album The Eyes of Alice Cooper

See also
 Backyard Bowl Series